Bellevue is a railway station on the Berlin Stadtbahn in the Hansaviertel district of Berlin, Germany. It is located on the elevated Stadtbahn line and served by Berlin S-Bahn trains. The station is named after nearby Bellevue Palace, the residence of the President of Germany.

Location

Beside Bellevue Place, the Victory Column and Tiergarten Park can be reached in the vicinity. The adjacent Modernist residential area was largely rebuilt as part of the 1957 Interbau exhibition.

History 
Work on the station started in 1875 and it was opened together with most other Stadtbahn stations on 7 February 1882. Today, it is one of the two Stadtbahn stations still partly in its original state (the other being Hackescher Markt). After the introduction of the S-Bahn rapid transit system, the platform was rebuilt and extended between 1928 and 1932. It was damaged by the Bombing of Berlin in World War II and patched up until 1957.

The station has been a listed building since 1987, when it was again faithfully restored for the 750th anniversary of Berlin. After German reunification, the entire Stadtbahn viaduct was extensively restored. On 11 November 1996, Bellevue station was reopened after its modernisation was completed.

Station layout

References

External links

Bellevue
Bellevue
Bellevue
Railway stations in Germany opened in 1882